Frederik Lodewijk Anthing (1820–1883) was one of the Dutch evangelists evangelizing in Java in the 19th century. He gave his attention toward evangelizing the indigenous people to the community along with the other evangelists such as Kiai Ibrahim Tunggul Wulung, Kiai Sadrach, Paul Tosari, and others. Anthing spread Christianity to the Java community.

References 

1820 births
1883 deaths
Evangelists